In Greek mythology, Nycteis (Ancient Greek: Νυκτηίς means "daughter of night") was the daughter of Nycteus and Polyxo. She married the son of Cadmus and Harmonia, Polydorus, a Theban king and mother by him of Labdacus, king of Thebes.

Notes 

Queens in Greek mythology

References 

 Apollodorus, The Library with an English Translation by Sir James George Frazer, F.B.A., F.R.S. in 2 Volumes, Cambridge, MA, Harvard University Press; London, William Heinemann Ltd. 1921. ISBN 0-674-99135-4. Online version at the Perseus Digital Library. Greek text available from the same website.
 Graves, Robert, The Greek Myths, Harmondsworth, London, England, Penguin Books, 1960. 
 Graves, Robert, The Greek Myths: The Complete and Definitive Edition. Penguin Books Limited. 2017.